Edward Adam Senn (born April 10, 1984) is an American model, actor, and restaurateur. He is known for playing Zero, a professional basketball player, on VH1's Hit the Floor from 2014 to 2016.

Early life
Senn was born in Paris, France, and grew up in Sugar Land, Texas, a suburb of Houston. He studied theater as a child and throughout high school. After high school Senn moved to New York City, where he attended Atlantic Theater, while working for fashion brands like Tom Ford and Gucci.

Career
Since 2002, Senn has modeled consistently for Gucci, Tom Ford, Versace, Dsquared, Tommy Hillfiger, Nautica.  Dolce & Gabbana in lookbooks, campaign ads, and fashion shows. He also became the face for their new One Sport fragrance campaign. Other fashion campaigns and editorials for 2012 included Express, photographed by Greg Kadel, Mavi Jeans campaign, snapped by Mariano Vivanco, and Blanco Suitebalanco. He covered the S/S 2012 Vogue Hombre and shot an editorial for Panorama magazines. According to Models.com, Senn was ranked #16 of "The Money Guys" for 2012.

Senn had a lead role in the 2011 movie Video Girl, costarring Meagan Good.

Senn portrayed bisexual basketball player Zero in VH1's Hit the Floor for two seasons, from 2014 to 2016.

Senn co-owns a restaurant named Bocca di Bacco in New York City.

Filmography

References

External links
 

Male models from Texas
People from Sugar Land, Texas
American restaurateurs
1984 births
Living people
American male television actors
Male actors from Paris